The Green Face (German: Das grüne Gesicht) is a 1916 novel by Gustav Meyrink. The book is set in Amsterdam and opens with a stranger visiting a peculiar magic shop, host to a number of unusual customers. One has a green face, which horrifies and haunts the stranger, so that he attempts to track down the man. Like his previous work The Golem, the book again makes use of the Wandering Jew trope.

References

1916 Austrian novels
1916 German-language novels
Austrian novels
Novels by Gustav Meyrink